Season 2 is the second Korean studio album (third overall) by the South Korean boy band Infinite. It was released on May 21, 2014 by Woollim Label. The album features thirteen tracks with "Last Romeo" serving as the title track. A repackage of the album titled Be Back, was released on July 22, 2014.

Background
A concept image for the group's comeback single "Last Romeo" was revealed on May 12, 2014, with Woollim Entertainment confirming later in an interview with Newsen that they would be making their comeback on May 21.

Track listing

Repackaged edition (Be Back)

Charts

Weekly charts

Monthly charts

Yearly charts

Release history

References

2014 albums
Infinite (group) albums
Woollim Entertainment albums
Kakao M albums